Deshawn L. Parker (born January 8, 1971 in Cincinnati, Ohio) is a Thoroughbred horse racing jockey who is a two-time United States Champion. In addition, on May 2, 2016 he became only the thirty-second jockey in the history of North American Thoroughbred racing to win 5,000 races.  On June 21, 2022 while racing at Horseshoe Indianapolis, Parker rode his 6,000th career winner, For Mama,  becoming one of only 21 jockeys to reach that rarified air.

Career
Deshawn Parker began his professional riding career in 1988. At 5 ft 11 in (1.80 m), he is one of the tallest jockeys in racing. In his first five years riding from 1988 through 1992, Deshawn Parker won just 60 races in total. The next year he won 72, more than the previous five combined and continued to improve. In 2002 he broke into the 200 level and in 2008 reached 300 plus wins for the first time and would accomplish that for five straight years including 2011 when he attained 400 wins.

In 2010, Deshawn Parker won 377 races to earn his first national title. It marked the first time an African-American had done so in the sport since James "Soup" Perkins one hundred and fifteen years earlier in 1895. Parker won his second national title in 2011 with 400 wins. He is also the winningest African-American in history. On May 6, 2012 Parker won six races on a single racecard at Mountaineer Racetrack in New Cumberland, West Virginia where he had made his home base for many years and where he is the all-time leading jockey in wins. In 2012, he was honored by the Jockeys' Guild with its Laffit Pincay Jr. Award and twice has been a finalist for the George Woolf Memorial Jockey Award.

External links
  Voice of America radio September 30, 2010 program 'Winning Ponies', Deshawn Parker interview by host  John Engelhardt
  Rachel McLaughlin interview titled "Getting to know Jockey Deshawn Parker" published April 21, 2017

References

1971 births
Living people
American jockeys
African-American jockeys
American Champion jockeys
Sportspeople from Cincinnati
People from New Cumberland, West Virginia
21st-century African-American sportspeople
20th-century African-American sportspeople